The Swansea Bay and West Wales Metro, or simply the Swansea Bay Metro (originally proposed as the South West Wales Metro) is a proposed railway enhancement around the Swansea Bay and South West Wales (or just West Wales) areas of South Wales. The project could take up to 10 years to complete.

About the project

The project is estimated to cost £1 billion. The project could see reopening of the Neath Valley line through new stations at Neath Abbey, Jersey Marine, Neath and Aberdulais, an on-street connection from Swansea to Mumbles, and new stations via the existing Swansea to Cardiff route. The project promises better use of existing infrastructure and faster journey times.

A feasibility study was due to start in April 2018.

Proposals

 A new line from Baglan to Swansea station diverting the mainline from the current route via Neath, reducing journey times to 30 Minutes
 The new Main Line would have stations at Swansea Bay Campus and SA1
 Reopening of the current freight only Neath Valley Line to passengers with new stations at Jersey Marine, Neath Abbey, Neath (shown as Neath 2) and Aberdulais
 A new line from Neath to Llansamlet Interchange via a new station at Llandarcy
 New stations on the existing Swansea to Baglan at Llansamlet Interchange, Phoenix and Morfa
 New stations at M4 J45, Morriston, M4 J46 and Pontlliw
 A new station on Station Road in Swansea

Councillors in Neath have expressed resistance to the idea of diverting trains between Cardiff and Swansea away from Neath. Councillor Rob Jones, the leader of Neath Port Talbot council said;

See also
Transport for Wales
South West Wales Integrated Transport Consortium

References

Swansea
Proposed public transport in the United Kingdom
Proposed transport infrastructure in Wales